The 2012 World Team Judo Championships were held in Salvador, Brazil from 27 to 28 October 2012.

Medal summary

References

External links
 

 
WC 2012
World Team Judo Championships